Frank Turner (born 1981) is an English folk/punk singer-songwriter.

Frank Turner may also refer to:

 Frank Turner (gymnast) (1922–2010), British Olympic gymnast
 Frank S. Turner (born 1947), American politician in the Maryland House of Delegates
 Frank Turner (basketball) (born 1988), American basketball player
 F. A. Turner (1858–1923), American actor sometimes credited as Frank Turner
 Frank Turner (footballer) (1886–1963), Australian rules footballer
 Frank Newman Turner (1913–1964), British organic farmer, writer and broadcaster
 Frank C. Turner (born 1951), Canadian actor and iconographer

See also
 Francis Turner (disambiguation)